A houseboy (alternatively spelled as houseboi) is a term which refers to a typically male domestic worker or personal assistant who performs cleaning and other forms of personal chores. The term has a record of being used in the British Empire, military slang, and the male LGBT community.

British Empire
Historically, houseboy was a term used in the British Empire for a male domestic servant.  He was usually, but not always, a native person who worked for a British family living in the non-British regions of the empire. A female housecleaner was termed a housegirl. Both sexes often wore uniform, due to their status as domestic servants.

Military slang 
Houseboy was also used as an American slang term originating in the Second World War for a young teenager who helped American soldiers perform basic responsibilities like cleaning, laundry, ironing, shoe-shining, running errands, etc. The British English term for this occupation was 'Batman'.

Gay culture 
A houseboy, as used by members of the LGBT community, refers to a young man who performs domestic work, where the employment normally has an erotic, though not necessarily sexual, aspect.

See also
 Housekeeper
 Fagging 
 :wikt:Garçon, the French word for "boy", also used as an occupational title
 House officer, previously "houseman", various grades of doctor in British hospitals
 House slave, as opposed to field slaves, during the period of slavery in the United States

References

Domestic work
Gay culture